Yuri Petrovich Vereykin (born July 27, 1939) is a Russian professional football coach and a former player.

He also worked as a referee.

External links
 Career summary by KLISF

1939 births
Living people
Soviet footballers
FC Shinnik Yaroslavl players
Soviet football referees
Russian football managers
Association football defenders